The 2006 World Junior Ice Hockey Championships (2006 WJHC) were held in Vancouver, Kelowna and Kamloops, British Columbia, Canada. The championships began on December 26, 2005, and finished on January 5, 2006. Games were played at GM Place and Pacific Coliseum in Vancouver, the Interior Savings Centre in Kamloops and Prospera Place in Kelowna. Canada was the winner defeating Russia 5–0 in the gold medal game. Total attendance was 325,138 (a new record) spread over 31 games, for an average of 10,488 per game.

Top Division

Venues

Rosters

Preliminary round
All times are local (UTC−8).

Group A

Group B

Relegation round

Final round

Bracket

Quarterfinals

Semifinals

Fifth place game

Bronze medal game

Final

Statistics

Scoring leaders

GP = Games played; G = Goals; A = Assists; Pts = Points; +/− = Plus-minus; PIM = Penalties In MinutesSource: IIHF

Goaltending leaders
(minimum 40% team's total ice time)

TOI = Time On Ice (minutes:seconds); GA = Goals against; GAA = Goals against average; Sv% = Save percentage; SO = ShutoutsSource: IIHF

Awards
Best players selected by the Directorate:
Best Goaltender:  Tuukka Rask
Best Defenceman:  Marc Staal
Best Forward:  Evgeni Malkin
Source: IIHF
Media All-Stars:
MVP:  Evgeni Malkin
Goaltender:  Tuukka Rask
Defencemen:  Luc Bourdon /  Jack Johnson
Forwards:  Evgeni Malkin /  Lauri Tukonen /  Steve Downie
Source: IIHF

Final standings

Division I
The Division I Championships were played on December 11–17, 2005 in Bled, Slovenia (Group A) and on December 12–18, 2005 in Minsk, Belarus.

Group A

Group B

Division II
The Division II Championships were played on December 12–18, 2005 in Bucharest, Romania (Group A) and on January 10–16, 2006 in Belgrade, Serbia and Montenegro.

Group A

Group B

Division III
The Division III Championship was played on January 3–9, 2006 in Elektrėnai and Kaunas, Lithuania.

References

External links
 IIHF official website
 Official website at www.hockeycanada.ca

 
World Junior Ice Hockey Championships
World Junior Ice Hockey Champsionship
Ice hockey competitions in Vancouver
International ice hockey competitions hosted by Canada
World junior championships
World Junior Ice Hockey Championships
World Junior Ice Hockey Championships
World Junior Ice Hockey Championships, 2006
World Junior Ice Hockey Championships
World Junior Ice Hockey Championships
Sport in Kamloops
Sport in Kelowna
International ice hockey competitions hosted by Lithuania
International ice hockey competitions hosted by Slovakia
International ice hockey competitions hosted by Belarus
International ice hockey competitions hosted by Romania
International ice hockey competitions hosted by Serbia and Montenegro
International sports competitions in Belgrade
World Junior Ice Hockey Championships, 2006
Sports competitions in Minsk
World Junior Ice Hockey Championships, 2006
Sports competitions in Bucharest
World Junior Ice Hockey Championships, 2006
Sport in Elektrėnai
World
World
World